Shadow of a Doubt is a 1995 American TV movie that was written and directed by its star Brian Dennehy. It was based on a novel by William J. Coughlin. The movie aired in the United States on December 3, 1995.

Plot
Charley Sloan (Brian Dennehy), a once-spectacular attorney and now recovering alcoholic is swept into the public spotlight when Robin Harwell (Bonnie Bedelia), a woman he once loved, hires him to defend her stepdaughter Angel Harwell (Fairuza Balk), who stands accused of murdering her millionaire father.

Despite mounting accusations that question his competence, and despite frenzied opposition by a politically ambitious prosecutor, Charley is reluctantly drawn into defending Angel in a high-profile trial that quickly becomes a media circus. As the courtroom tension escalates, Charley discovers he is as much on trial as his client.

Driven by a desperate need to redeem himself, Charley descends into a shadowy world of murder and money, illusion and deceit. Against tremendous odds, Charley must find a way to prove to the jury that Angel might be innocent and to create in their minds a small but crucial ... ‘shadow of a doubt’.

Cast
 Brian Dennehy as Charley Sloane
 Bonnie Bedelia as Robin Harwell
 Fairuza Balk as Angel Harwell
 Mike Nussbaum as Nate Golden
 Kevin Dunn as Mark Evola
 Joe Grifasi as Sidney Sherman
 Michael MacRae as Walter Figer (as Michael Macrae)
 Ken Pogue as Judge Brown
 Donnelly Rhodes as Williams
 Brent Jennings as Little Mike
 Bruce McGill as Dr. Fred Williams
 Mavor Moore as Max Webster
 Henry Beckman as Judge Mulhern
 Don S. Davis as Kevin Carroll Sr.

Reception
Andy Webb of The Movie Scene awarded the film 3 out of 5 stars, saying that Shadow of a Doubt "ends up entertaining but in a bit of a bad movie way due to the over the top performances and a variety of forced scenes." Nevertheless, he recommended it to fans of Brian Dennehy.

References

External links
 
 
 

1995 television films
1995 films
NBC network original films
1990s legal films
American courtroom films
Films based on American novels
1990s American films